Cycling at the 1970 Asian Games was held in Bangkok, Thailand between 10 and 19 September 1970.

Medalists

Road

Track

Medal table

References 

 The Straits Times, September 11–21, 1970

External links 
Medalists Road
Medalists Track

 
1970 Asian Games events
1970
Asian Games
1970 Asian Games
1970 in road cycling
1970 in track cycling